
Nowy Sącz County is a unit of territorial administration and local government (powiat) in Lesser Poland Voivodeship, southern Poland, on the Slovak border. It came into being on January 1, 1999, as a result of the Polish local government reforms passed in 1998. Its administrative seat is the city of Nowy Sącz, although the city is not part of the county (it constitutes a separate city county).

As of 2006 its total population is 197,718, out of which the population of Krynica-Zdrój is 11,243, that of Stary Sącz is 8,987, that of Grybów is 6,025, that of Piwniczna-Zdrój is 5,717, that of Muszyna is 4,980, and the rural population is 160,766.

Neighbouring counties
Apart from the city of Nowy Sącz, Nowy Sącz County is also bordered by Nowy Targ County and Limanowa County to the west, Brzesko County and Tarnów County to the north, and Gorlice County to the east. It also borders Slovakia to the south.

Administrative division
The county is subdivided into 16 gminas (one urban, four urban-rural and 11 rural). These are listed in the following table, in descending order of population.

Nowy Sacz County in the Past  
The history of Nowy Sacz County dates back to late 13th century, when King Wenceslaus II of Bohemia granted Magdeburg rights to Nowy Sacz. The new town quickly became most important administrative center of the region, and the seat of a local castellan and starosta. The county was probably established during the reign of King Kazimierz Wielki, who encouraged settlement in this sparsely populated region of his domain.

Until the Partitions of Poland, Nowy Sacz County belonged to Kraków Voivodeship. Its total area was 3900 sq. kilometers, with 12 towns (as for 1667), including Wojnicz, Czchow, Nowy Targ, Zakliczyn, Muszyna and Grybow.

After the first partition of Poland (1772), Nowy Sacz County became part of Austrian Galicia, in which it remained until 1918 (for more information, see Subdivisions of Galicia). In the Second Polish Republic, Nowy Sacz County was part of Kraków Voivodeship (1919–39); after World War II, the county remained part of Krakow Voivodeship until 1975, when all counties were disbanded (see Administrative division of the Polish People's Republic).

References
Polish official population figures 2006

 
Land counties of Lesser Poland Voivodeship